

Baird Bay  is a small fishing village located  south of Streaky Bay on the west coast of Eyre Peninsula in South Australia. It is situated on the east coast of a bay named Baird Bay which opens into the north end of Anxious Bay.

Nomenclature 
The locality is named after the nearby bay which was named after James Baird, who settled on the shores of Anxious Bay in 1850 before being speared by local Aboriginals on 2 November 1850.  The bay was known as Beard's Bay until 5 December 1940 when it was renamed to Baird Bay by proclamation.

Ecotourism 
Although the township is small, Baird Bay has become a tourist attraction due to its Australian sea lion colony. Local tour guides take small groups of tourists for interactive swimming sessions with the sea lions and Bottlenose dolphins. It is regarded as one of the best dive or snorkeling destinations in South Australia. The remote waters of Baird Bay are also popular for recreational fishing.

The isolated town has very limited facilities, with only a few houses, a camping ground and boat ramp.

The 2016 Australian census which was conducted in August 2016 reported that Baird Bay had a population of 3 people.

Baird Bay is located within the federal division of Grey, the state electoral district of Flinders and the local government area of the District Council of Streaky Bay.

References

External links
Baird Bay webpage on  Streaky Bay (LGA) Official Tourism Website

Coastal towns in South Australia
Eyre Peninsula
Bays of South Australia
Fishing communities in Australia